Darkness Falls may refer to:

 Darkness Falls (1999 film), a British drama starring Ray Winstone
 Darkness Falls (2003 film), an American horror film starring Emma Caulfield
 "Darkness Falls" (The X-Files), a 1994 episode of The X-Files
 Darkness Falls, a 1997 online fantasy role-playing game by Mythic Entertainment
 Darkness Falls, a 1994 List of Hardy Boys books#The Hardy Boys Casefiles (1987–1998) novel
 "Darkness Falls" (The Legend of Korra), a 2013 episode of The Legend of Korra
 Darkness Falls, the third book in Survivors (novel series) by Erin Hunter
 "Darkness Falls", a 2018 track by Toby Fox from Deltarune Chapter 1 OST from the video game Deltarune